Tinus du Plessis (born 20 May 1984 in Windhoek) is a Namibian rugby union player and a member of the Namibia national rugby union team. He is a back-row player who plays on both flanks and at number eight.

Early life
Du Plessis attended Windhoek High School in Windhoek and is a graduate from Stellenbosch University. In 2003, he attended Gisborne Boys' High School and played first XV rugby in the Super 8 competition in New Zealand. He was the shot put athletics champion as well.

Club career
He has played club rugby in Namibia for Wanderers RFC, and professionally in England for Rotherham Titans RFC. He was named Rotherham's player of the year in 2009. In December 2011 he joined London Wasps, on a deal taking him through to the end of the season. Having impressed during his time at Wasps Du Plessis was awarded a two-year contract. Du Plessis signed for English Championship club London Scottish for the remainder of the 2015–2016 season.

International career
He was selected for the Namibian squad to play in the 2007 Rugby World Cup where he made three appearances. Having appeared in the Africa Cup in 2008 and 2009 and the RWC 2011 Qualifiers he now has 23 full international caps. He was a member of the victorious Namibia Squad that won the 2010 IRB Nations Cup which went alongside their 2009 African Cup win.

He received the Man of the Match award in a 2011 Rugby World Cup match against Wales in which his Wasps teammate Heinz Koll scored a try. However Namibia lost the match 81–7.

References

1984 births
Living people
Expatriate rugby union players in England
Namibia international rugby union players
Namibian Afrikaner people
Namibian expatriate rugby union players
Namibian expatriate sportspeople in England
Namibian rugby union players
People educated at Gisborne Boys' High School
People educated at Windhoek High School
Rotherham Titans players
Rugby union flankers
Rugby union number eights
Rugby union players from Windhoek
Stellenbosch University alumni
White Namibian people